is a  puzzle video game released by Fujisankei Communications International for the Game Boy in 1989 and Game Gear in 1990.

Its Japanese title is Soukoban. The gameplay is the same as in other games in the Sokoban series, with the plot being that the player must maneuver boxes in a warehouse in order to make enough money to woo his desired girlfriend. It had a sequel called Boxxle 2.

References

1989 video games
Game Boy games
Game Gear games
Puzzle video games
Single-player video games
Thinking Rabbit games
Video game clones
Video games developed in Japan
Atelier Double games